The Incredible Planet is a  science fiction fix-up novel by American author John W. Campbell, Jr. It was published in 1949 by Fantasy Press in an edition of 3,998 copies.  The novel is a collection of three linked novelettes that were not accepted for the magazine Astounding SF. The stories are sequels to Campbell's 1934 novel The Mightiest Machine.

Contents
 "The Incredible Planet"
 "The Interstellar Search"
 "The Infinite Atom"

Reception
Astounding reviewer P. Schuyler Miller found "The Incredible Planet" "a kind of bridge to the Don A. Stuart style which writer-editor Campbell [had been] developing." Everett F. Bleiler thought the sequels "lack the strengths, such as they are, of The Mightiest Machine."

References

Sources

1949 American novels
American science fiction novels
Fantasy Press books